Al-walāʾ wa-l-barāʾ  is a concept associated with Islam.  It literally means "loyalty and disavowal", which signifies loving and hating for the sake of Allah.

History 
The concept is derived from the Qur'an, and according to Wagemakers the earliest groups to have derived it in particular were the early Ibadi and Khawarij movements. Later on it also became associated with the Shi'a. Sunnis were less enthusiastic about a concept that they associated with heterodox groups, and the founder of the Hanbali school, Ahmad ibn Hanbal (d. 241 H/ 855 CE) in particular was reported to have dismissed loyalty and disavowal to specific individuals as Bidʻah. However within a few hundred years, the Hanbali scholar Ibn Taymiyyah (d. 728 H/ 1328 CE) adopted the idea in order to ensure Muslims were sticking on the straight path in disavowing the religious practices of the local non-Muslims. Muhammad ibn Abd al-Wahhab (d. 1792 CE) being influenced by his teachings, taught this doctrine which subsequently has a central place in Wahhabism and modern Salafism.

Description 
Al-wala' wa-l-bara' is referred to as holding fast to all that is pleasing to God, and withdrawing from and opposing all that is displeasing to Allah, for the sake of Allah. This is for their calling towards something other than submission to Allah, whether on purpose or by nature of disbelief. Loving for the sake of Allah means to love Allah and to show loyalty to him by following his Shariah. It means to love all that is good and permissible in the Quran and Sunnah. This type of love requires one to defend Allah's deen and to preserve it. It is to love those who are obedient to Allah and to defend and assist them. Hating for the sake of Allah signifies showing anger towards those who oppose Allah, His messenger, His deen, and the believers.

See also 
 Tawalla & Tabarra, similar concept in Shia theology.

References

Islamic terminology
Jihadism
Islamic fundamentalism